The second series of Gladiators started in December 2008 with a Legends Special. The series aired on Sky1 and Sky1 HD. Many changes were made from the first series, including six new gladiators - Cyclone (returning from series one), Siren, Amazon, Warrior, Goliath and Doom. Three more games were added to the event pool - Pursuit & Suspension Bridge, which were seen in the ITV version of the show, and Rocketball. Ian Wright returned as presenter with Caroline Flack, who replaced Kirsty Gallacher. Taking over from original referee John Anderson (due to his retirement from TV refereeing) was boxing referee John Coyle.

Gladiators
Female:
 Amazon
 Battleaxe
 Cyclone
 Enigma
 Inferno
 Panther
 Siren
 Tempest

Male:
 Atlas
 Doom
 Goliath
 Oblivion
 Predator
 Spartan
 Tornado
 Warrior

Ex-Gladiators (who didn't return for Series 2):
 Ice
 Destroyer

Bold represents new Gladiators for Series 2.

Events

Three new events were added to the pool for the second series. Suspension Bridge and Pursuit returned from the original series. Suspension Bridge is now played over water and the Pursuit course also contains a water element. The only new event was Rocketball, a modified version of Swingshot from the original series. The Eliminator layout was also heavily revised for this series, now including the "Floor Travelator" as the preceding obstacle to the monkey bars.

The Contenders

Notes: Red & Blue denote the colours worn by the contestant 
Contenders in bold are the ones that advanced 
^ denotes the fastest runner-up in the 1/4 finals thus advancing to the semis.

Ratings
Episode Viewing figures from BARB

Series

Specials

Specials

The Legends Strike Back
Aired on 21 December 2008, original Gladiators Lightning, Wolf, Scorpio, Trojan, Rocket, Cobra, Siren and Bullit returned to the arena to compete against the new breed of Gladiators. In both of the Eliminators, the new breed of Gladiators won.

Battle of the Forces
Aired on 15 February 2009, Contenders from the RAF, Navy and the Army competed against each other in the second Battle of the Forces competition. The winning female contender was from the RAF and the winning male contender was from the Army.

Champion of Champions
Aired on 5 April 2009, last year's champions, Anna and Simon, compete against this year's champions, Kathryn and David. Anna proved to be on better form in the women's competition, but Simon failed to meet his expectations, and this year's winner David scooped the win.

Battle of the Athletes
Aired on 12 April 2009, four Olympic Athletes - Karen Pickering, Kelly Smith, James DeGale and Kyran Bracken - competed against each other for charity. Kelly Smith and Kyran Bracken were the Champions. Although a first occurred in Gladiators as boxer James DeGale slipped on the Floor Travelator, which has never happened before.

The Legends Last Stand
Aired on 25 October 2009, in the last ever episode, ex-Gladiators Trojan, Ace, Khan, Cobra, Rebel, Vogue, Panther and Siren return to the arena for one last time to compete against the new Gladiators. Features include Khan facing Goliath on Duel, and Wolf battling Trojan on Earthquake.

Notes and references

External links
Gladiators at Sky1.co.uk
Gladiators at Gladiators Zone
Gladiators at UKGameshows.com
Yvette Shaw at YvetteShaw.com

2008 British television seasons
2009 British television seasons
series 10